Abdulsalam Al-Gadabi (born January 1, 1978, in Sana'a, Yemen) is an Olympic swimmer from Yemen. He swam for Yemen at the 2008 Olympics, where he also swam at the 2007 World Championships in Melbourne.

His personal best for 50 m freestyle is 30.63 (at 2008 Olympics) and he holds the Yemeni Record in the 100 m freestyle with a time 1:05.34.

References

External links
 

Yemeni male swimmers
Olympic swimmers of Yemen
Swimmers at the 2008 Summer Olympics
People from Sanaa
1978 births
Living people